Triune Fortification is a historic site in or near Arrington, Tennessee that was listed on the National Register of Historic Places in 1999. It has significance from American Civil War activity there in 1863.

In 2008, it was advocated that a conservation easement to preserve the property should be created.  The Triune fortifications were asserted to be "one of the most intact and unaltered set[s] of Civil War earthworks in
Tennessee."

See also
Roper's Knob Fortifications

References

Archaeological sites on the National Register of Historic Places in Tennessee
Buildings and structures in Williamson County, Tennessee
Military facilities on the National Register of Historic Places in Tennessee
Infrastructure completed in 1863
American Civil War forts
National Register of Historic Places in Williamson County, Tennessee